WACR-FM (105.3 FM) is a radio station licensed to Columbus Air Force Base, United States. The station is currently owned by URBan Radio Broadcasting, through licensee GTR Licenses, LLC, and broadcasts an Urban Adult Contemporary format.

History
The station went on the air as WWZQ on 1986-10-01.  On 1998-05-22, the station changed its call sign to WWKZ, on 2005-07-20 to the current WACR-FM,

References

External links

ACR-FM
Urban adult contemporary radio stations in the United States
Urban Radio Broadcasting radio stations